The Bowden Lithia Springs Short Line Railroad is a historic,  narrow gauge railroad that operated in the U.S. state of Georgia.

During its existence, it was also known as the Salt Springs and Bowden Lithia Railroad.

The railroad wasn't actually chartered until 1887, and it was abandoned in 1913.

References

Defunct Georgia (U.S. state) railroads
Narrow gauge railroads in Georgia (U.S. state)
3 ft gauge railways in the United States